Humboldt County may refer to:

Places in the United States
 Humboldt County, California
 Humboldt County, Iowa
 Humboldt County, Nevada

Arts, entertainment, and media
 Humboldt County (film), a 2008 film about the marijuana cultivation culture in Humboldt County, California
 Humboldt County High, a 2001 album by American hip hop group Potluck

See also
 
 Humboldt (disambiguation)